Eagle & Evans is an episodic Australian sketch show and comedy series that first screened on ABC TV in 2004. The series of eight episodes was set in a fictional variety show The Blaze da Silva Experience. The main characters, Eagle and Evans, are the warm-up act for Blaze da Silva, the self-titled "most loved man on television".

The series was created and co-authored by Craig Eagle and Dailan Evans along with staff writers Nicholas Bufalo (who also directed the series), Anita Punton, Tal Brott, Mike Flattley and Nick Venus, with contributions by Tim Smith.  The script editor was guest star Bob Franklin.

Cast
 Craig Eagle
 Dailan Evans 
 Anita Punton  
 Tal Brott 
 Michael Flattley  
 Nick Venus 
 Bob Franklin 
 Ross Daniels
 Andrew Goodone

References

External links
 

Australian Broadcasting Corporation original programming
Australian television sketch shows
2004 Australian television series debuts
2005 Australian television series endings